Kotuń  (German: Kattun) is a village in the administrative district of Gmina Szydłowo, within Piła County, Greater Poland Voivodeship, in west-central Poland.

The village has a population of 690.

References

Villages in Piła County